Michel Noyan (born 16 April 1985) is an Assyrian professional footballer. He currently plays for Assyriska Föreningen in Sweden, as a defender.

References

1985 births
Living people
Swedish footballers
Assyriska FF players
Place of birth missing (living people)
Assyrian footballers
Association footballers not categorized by position